Carole Baillien (born 10 January 1968) is a Belgian actress and author.

Carole plays characters in theatrical, television, and Belgian and French movies. She also contributes to French language voice work for foreign movies, shows, and videogames as well. She is best known as the French language of Naruto Uzumaki in the French version of Naruto.

Roles and directions in French

Films
 Le Piège du Père Noël TV from Christian Faure
  La Face Cachée, drama from Bernard Campan
 La Fabrique des sentiments, drama from Jean-Marc Moutout
 Enfant de ..., shortcut from Carole Baillien

Theater
 Coc'opéra ou les choix de Chanel from O. Mothes and E. Eramberg. 
 Les chasseurs de rêves fromM. Paviç
 Mignonne allons voir si la rose… from Cavanna
 Série noire pour un bœuf from R. Bonaccorsi
 Le livre de Daubmanus from M. Paviç
 ILLI (les phobies) from Carole baillien. 
 Confessions d'un autre genre from Carole baillien.
 Les Manipulateurs from Carole Baillien

Dubbing works in French

Cinema (French version)
 Beyond justice: Jodie
 Haine et Passion: Mel
 Kill Me Later: Shawn
 Le Mariage de Tuya: Tuya
 Les Supers génies: Sammy
 Millions: Damian

Series TV (French version)
 Alerte Cobra: Andrea Schäfer
 Balko: Colette
 Doctor Who: Donna Noble 
 Falcon Down: Sharon Williams
 The Hard Times of RJ Berger : Lily Miran
 Homicidios: Eva Hernandez
 Lip Service: Sam Murray
 Ma baby-sitter est un vampire: Sarah
 McLeod's Daughters: Tess
 Shameless: Karen et Liam
 Leipzig Homicide: Ina
 This life: Milly
 William et Mary: Mary Gilcrest

Cartoons (French version)
 Naruto Uzumaki in Naruto
 Bloom in Winx Club
 Noah in Jacob Two-Two
 Trixie Tang in The Fairly OddParents
 Mabel Pines in Gravity Falls
 Adam Lyon in My Gym Partner's a Monkey
 Martha in Martha Speaks
 Astro Boy: Abercrombie
 Babe My Love: Marika, Miyako Sakashita
 Beyblade: Max 
 Beyblade: Metal Fusion: Yu 
 Black Cat: Train Heartnet (enfant)
 Burst Angel: Jo
 Code Lyoko: |Sissi]], Nicolas Poliakoff
 Creepschool: Elsa
 Franklin: Basile
 Gravity Falls: Mabel Pines
 Jacob Jacob: Noah
 Jungle Junction: Rosie
 Kirby: Right Back at Ya!: Tif
 L'Ange Tirelire: Rita
 Martha speaks: Martha
 Marvin/Martin: Edna/Zelda 
 Miss Spider: Spido
 Nonoko: Nonoko
 Les Podcats: Mimo
 Popetown: Sœur Marie
 Pound Puppies: Strudel
 Shin-chan: Nanako
 Super Samson: Samson
 Tracey Mc Bean: Megan
 Viva Pinata: Plume Elephanille, Cécile serpistache, Ginette Meuhfine
 Wombat City: Sharon
 Yu-Gi-Oh!: Maï Kujaku, Serenity Wheeler, Rebecca 
 Zorori le magnifique: Ishishi

Video games (French version) 
 Naruto Uzumaki in Naruto: Rise of a Ninja
 Winx Club'': Bloom

References

External links
  
 
 

1968 births
Living people
Actresses from Brussels
Belgian voice actresses
Belgian writers in French
Belgian women writers